|}
Maxwell Henry Ortmann (born 3 June 1941) is a former Australian politician. He was the Country Liberal Party member for Brennan in the Northern Territory Legislative Assembly from 1990 to 1994. Ortmann defeated sitting CLP MLA Col Firmin both for preselection and when Firmin ran as an Independent. He earned the sobriquet "Mad Max" following an incident where he wrapped a microphone cord around the neck of Jeremy Thompson, an ABC reporter, after a series of probing questions. Ortmann lost preselection to Denis Burke in 1994 and was defeated as an independent.

References

1941 births
Living people
Members of the Northern Territory Legislative Assembly
Country Liberal Party members of the Northern Territory Legislative Assembly
Independent members of the Northern Territory Legislative Assembly